The Boy and the Fog is a 1953 Mexican drama film directed by Roberto Gavaldón. It was entered into the 1954 Cannes Film Festival.

Plot
Marta (Dolores del Río) is a woman who lives obsessed, since her brother died of schizophrenia and her mother remains interned at a mental health hospital. Fearful that the disease is congenital, Marta keeps her family background secret from her husband while overprotecting her only son. Because of her obsession, Marta does not realize that the only psychologically affected in her family is her.

Cast
 Dolores del Río
 Alejandro Ciangherotti (as Alejandro Ciangherotti hijo)
 Miguel Ángel Ferriz
 Lupe Inclán
 Pedro López Lagar
 Tana Lynn
 Eduardo Noriega
 Carlos Riquelme

References

External links

1953 drama films
1953 films
Best Picture Ariel Award winners
Films directed by Roberto Gavaldón
Mexican black-and-white films
1950s Spanish-language films
Mexican drama films
1950s Mexican films